Municipality of El Fuerte is a municipality in Sinaloa in northwestern Mexico. Its seat is El Fuerte city.

Political subdivision 
El Fuerte Municipality is subdivided in 7 sindicaturas:
Mochicahui
Charay
San Blas
Tehueco
Tetaroba
Chinobampo
Jahuara II

References

Municipalities of Sinaloa